State Route 183 (SR 183) is a  state highway that serves as a north-south connection predominantly through Perry County. SR 183 intersects US 80 at its southern terminus in Uniontown and US 82 at its northern terminus in Chilton County.

Route description
SR 183 begins at its intersection with US 80 in Uniontown. From this point, the route travels in a northerly direction through Uniontown before taking a more northeasterly course en route to Marion. At Marion, SR 183 begins an approximately  concurrency with SR 5 through the town and then begins another approximately  concurrency SR 14 at the eastern end of Marion through Sprott. From Sprott, SR 183 continues on its northeasterly course through the Talladega National Forest en route to its northern terminus at US 82 in Chilton County.

Major intersections

References

183
Transportation in Chilton County, Alabama
Transportation in Perry County, Alabama